This is a list of episodes for the single season MyNetworkTV telenovella Fashion House.

Episodes
These episodes aired as a part of MyNetworkTV's weekday primetime schedule.

Series recaps

Highlights episodes

External links 
 

Fashion House|Fashion House